Colin McAdam (28 August 1951 – 1 August 2013) was a Scottish professional football player, best known for his time with Rangers. He played as both a centre back and a striker during his career.

Football career
McAdam started his professional career as a defender with Dumbarton and had spells at Motherwell and Partick Thistle. He joined Rangers for £165,000 in June 1980. He made his debut for Rangers on 9 August 1980 in a Premier Division match against Airdrieonians which finished as a 1–1 draw. Under then manager John Greig, McAdam played mainly as a striker. His first goal came in his second appearance (against Partick Thistle) and set him on the road to an end of season tally of 21. The following season proved not to be quite as successful and McAdam found himself being played in defence to cover injuries. Gradually he became more of a squad player and found himself surplus to requirements when Jock Wallace took over the reins at the club for his second spell in charge. After 99 first team appearances and 32 goals he left Ibrox, with his penultimate appearance being the Scottish League Cup final in March 1984.

After a two-game stint with Australian side Adelaide City he returned to Scotland to sign for Hearts in September 1985. He left Tynecastle in October 1986 having only played six times, all as a substitute. He re-joined former club Partick Thistle for two seasons, who were now under the control of former teammate Derek Johnstone. After spells in the juniors with Irvine Meadow and Maryhill, McAdam retired in 1990.

Personal life and death
McAdam's younger brother Tom was also a footballer. A defender, he played for Rangers' biggest rivals Celtic at the same time Colin was at Rangers, and they played against each other in Old Firm matches eight times. They both started at Dumbarton and played there alongside each other, and both later signed for Motherwell but at different times.

McAdam died on 1 August 2013, aged 61.

References

External links
 

1951 births
2013 deaths
Dumbarton F.C. players
Motherwell F.C. players
Partick Thistle F.C. players
Rangers F.C. players
Heart of Midlothian F.C. players
Adelaide City FC players
Scottish footballers
Association football forwards
Scottish Football League players
Irvine Meadow XI F.C. players
Scottish Football League representative players
Maryhill F.C. players
Scottish expatriate sportspeople in Australia
Scottish expatriate footballers
Expatriate soccer players in Australia